Papilio phorcas, the apple-green swallowtail or green-banded swallowtail, is a butterfly of the family Papilionidae. It is found in Africa.

The larvae feed on Teclea nobilis, Teclea simplicifolia, Macrostylis villosa, Vepris, Calodendrum, Clausena, Citrus, Fagara and Toddalia species.

Description
A tailed species. The ground colour is black, with green markings.

Taxonomy
Papilio phorcas is a member of the dardanus species group. The members of the clade are:

Papilio dardanus Brown, 1776
Papilio constantinus Ward, 1871
Papilio delalandei Godart, [1824]
Papilio phorcas Cramer, [1775]
Papilio rex Oberthür, 1886

Subspecies
P. p. phorcas (Guinea, Sierra Leone, Liberia, Ivory Coast, Ghana, Togo, Benin, Nigeria)
P. p. ansorgei Rothschild, 1896.  (Kenya (highland forest east of the Rift Valley))
P. p. congoanus Rothschild, 1896 (Nigeria, Cameroon, Equatorial Guinea, Gabon, Congo, Central African Republic, northern Angola, Congo Republic, western Uganda, western Tanzania, northern Zambia)
P. p. nyikanus Rothschild & Jordan, 1903   (highland forest of north-eastern Zambia, Malawi and eastern Tanzania)
P. p. ruscoei Krüger, 1928   (eastern Uganda, Kenya (highlands west of the Rift Valley))
P. p. sudanicola Storace, 1965  (southern Sudan)
P. p. tenuifasciatus Kielland, 1990 (northern Tanzania, Kenya)
P. p. bardamu Canu, 1994    (Bioko Island)

Biogeographic realm
Afrotropical realm.

References

Carcasson, R.H. 1960 "The Swallowtail Butterflies of East Africa (Lepidoptera, Papilionidae)". Journal of the East Africa Natural History Society pdf Key to East Africa members of the species group, diagnostic and other notes and figures. (Permission to host granted by The East Africa Natural History Society)

Storace, L.,1955 Su alcune Papilionidae Africane, con descrizioni di nuove forme (Lepidoptera, Diurna). Memorie della Societa Entomologica Italiana 33:120-137.

External links

Butterfly Corner Images from Naturhistorisches Museum Wien

Butterflies described in 1775
phorcas
Taxa named by Pieter Cramer